Loudmilla Bencheikh (born 29 May 2001) is a French tennis player.

She has career-high rankings by the Women's Tennis Association (WTA) of 503 in singles and 501 in doubles, and has won two doubles titles on the ITF Circuit.

Bencheikh made her Grand Slam debut at the 2019 French Open after receiving a wildcard for the doubles main draw, partnering Coco Gauff.

In January 2021, she signed a scholarship to play for the University of Alabama.

References

External links
 
 

2001 births
Living people
French female tennis players
Tennis players from Paris
Alabama Crimson Tide women's tennis players